XHVSL-TDT, branded on air as Televalles, is a television station licensed to Ciudad Valles, San Luis Potosí, Mexico. Broadcasting on channel 8 from a main transmitter located east of Ciudad Valles on Cerro El Abra, XHVSL is a local independent station.

History
XHVSL signed on in 1996, under the concessionaire Alfonso Esper Bujaidar. Upon Esper's death in 2008, Adrián and Alfonso Esper Cárdenas inherited the station, and they consolidated their interest under the company TV Ocho, S.A. de C.V. Since this station signed on, it has been co-operated with XEIR-AM, which migrated to FM as XHIR-FM.

Programming
Televalles produces a large quantity of local programming. The station produces a local newscast on weekdays, known as NTV, as well as programs such as Conexión Universitaria, a program for students of the Universidad Autónoma de San Luis Potosí.

XHVSL was previously a local affiliate of Televisa's Nueve and FOROtv networks.

Translators
XHVSL has two translator stations that extend the station's signal to the north and south:

Unlike many translator stations, both translators of XHVSL have separate names and identities: "TV Tamazunchale" and "TV Mante".

References

Television stations in San Luis Potosí
Television stations in Ciudad Mante